Richard Kozak (born September 20, 1949 in Saint Boniface, Manitoba) is a politician in Manitoba, Canada.  He was a member of the Legislative Assembly of Manitoba from 1988 to 1990, representing the eastern Winnipeg riding of Transcona for the Manitoba Liberal Party.

Kozak was educated in Political Science at the University of Winnipeg, French at Université Laval and Political Economy at the University of Toronto.  He worked as a financial planner before entering political life.

In the Manitoba provincial election of 1988, Kozak was elected in Transcona over incumbent New Democrat Wilson Parasiuk by 709 votes.  The seat had previously been regarded as safe for the NDP.  The Liberals increased their parliamentary strength from one to twenty in this election, and Kozak served as his party's Finance Critic and Deputy House Leader for the next two years.  Support for the NDP rebounded in the 1990 provincial election, and Kozak lost to NDP candidate Daryl Reid by almost 2000 votes.  He has not sought a return to political life since this time.

Election results

 
|Progressive Conservative
|Bill Omiucke
| style="text-align:right;" |2,270
| style="text-align:right;" |23.94

References

1949 births
Living people
Manitoba Liberal Party MLAs
People from Saint Boniface, Winnipeg
Politicians from Winnipeg